The Ebriach dialect (obirščina) is a Slovene dialect in the Carinthian dialect group. It is spoken in Austrian Carinthia around Bad Eisenkappel, in the watershed of the Vellach River and Ebriach Creek, and Jezersko.

Phonological and morphological characteristics
The Ebriach dialect has uvular stops in place of velars, it has close reflexes of the nasal vowels, and varying reflexes of the old acute and neoacute on short syllables. There has been accentual retraction from circumflected long vowels (e.g., vèčer vs. standard Slovene večêr).

References

Slovene dialects